M71, M-71, or M.71 may refer to:

 Globular Cluster M71 or Messier 71, a globular cluster in the constellation Sagitta
 INS Kozhikode (M71), a minesweeper of the Karwar class
 M71 (Johannesburg), a major metropolitan road route in Johannesburg, South Africa
 M-71 (Michigan highway), a state highway in Michigan
 M/71 mine, an Egyptian mine
 Macchi M.71, an Italian flying boat fighter aircraft of the 1930s
 Miles M.71 Merchantman, a bigger all-metal design of the Miles Aerovan
 PM M71 Floating Bridge, pontoon bridge of the Soviet PMP Floating Bridge design located in the former Yugoslavia
 RK 71 or commercially M71, a Finnish assault rifle
 Shvetsov M-71, soviet air-cooled aircraft engine of World War II era
 Soltam M-71, a 1979 Israeli 155 mm 39 calibre towed howitzer